The Limassol Marathon is part of an annual European race series which takes place in Limassol, Cyprus. It was first run in 2006.  The event features a number of races over two days, including a marathon.

The marathon is recognized by the Association of International Marathons and Distance Races and the International Association of Athletics Federations.

History 
In 2015 the Marathon attracted more than 10,000 participants from 50 countries, of whom about 15% came from abroad. Runners are mostly European but participation from Japan, US, Brazil, Australia, China and Turkey are very common. The oldest runner in 2015 was Cypriot Andreas Pampakas, aged 78 with children as young as 5 years old participating as well.

The thirteenth edition was held on 23 and 24 of March 2019.

Course 
The OPAP Limassol Marathon GSO course is of a low degree of difficulty.  The start of the race is at the center of the city on the seafront of the Limassol promenade and follows the Mediterranean coastline along the beachfront, to the ruins of the ancient Royal City of Amathus and back to the city.  The athletes head west to the Port of Limassol, passing by the streets “Christodoulou Hadjipavlou” and “Spyrou Araouzou” towards the roundabout at the Limassol Marina. The path continues towards the streets Kioproulouzate, Xelal Bazaar and the Avenue Franklin Roosevelt.

Roads are officially closed to traffic throughout the entire length of the race and medical support is offered along the race course.

Other races 

Aside from the marathon, the event also features a half marathon, a 10 km energy Race, a 5 km city race, a 5 km corporate race and a youth race

The full marathon begins 2 hours before the 10K and 5k.

Management

Marketing 

Limassol Marathon official song of the event is called Ladies & Gentlemen (Limassol Marathon Version) it was created in 2014 by the Greek music band S.M.Fusion and was released from the record company Sugar Faktory for the 10th edition of the Limassol Marathon.

In 2016, Argos Animal Sanctuary manager, Andrew Brown run the Marathon by wearing a dog costume in temperatures reaching 22 degrees as a PR stand to attract attention for the animal shelter.

Winners 

Key: Course record (in bold)

Notes

References

External links
 

Sport in Limassol
Annual sporting events in Cyprus
2006 establishments in Cyprus
Recurring sporting events established in 2006
Marathons in Europe
Spring (season) events in Cyprus